Tony's may refer to:
Tony Awards
Tony's Pizza, made by the Schwan Food Company